Clifton is a town in Penobscot County, Maine, United States. The population was 840 at the 2020 census. It is part of the Bangor Metropolitan Statistical Area.

Geography

Demographics

2010 census
As of the census of 2010, there were 921 people, 346 households, and 256 families living in the town. The racial makeup of the town was 95.0% White, 1.1% African American, 1.5% Native American, 0.3% Asian, and 2.1% from two or more races. Hispanic or Latino of any race were 1.0% of the population.

There were 346 households, of which 34.4% had children under the age of 18 living with them, 57.2% were married couples living together, 11.0% had a female householder with no husband present, 5.8% had a male householder with no wife present, and 26.0% were non-families. 18.8% of all households were made up of individuals, and 5.5% had someone living alone who was 65 years of age or older. The average household size was 2.64 and the average family size was 2.93.

The median age in the town was 41.1 years. 23.9% of residents were under the age of 18; 6.9% were between the ages of 18 and 24; 25.5% were from 25 to 44; 33.8% were from 45 to 64; and 10% were 65 years of age or older. The gender makeup of the town was 52.2% male and 47.8% female.

2000 census
As of the census of 2000, there were 743 people, 303 households, and 213 families living in the town.  The population density was 21.6 people per square mile (8.3/km2).  There were 416 housing units at an average density of 12.1 per square mile (4.7/km2).  The racial makeup of the town was 97.85% White, 0.27% African American, 1.08% Native American, 0.13% Asian, 0.13% Pacific Islander, and 0.54% from two or more races. Hispanic or Latino of any race were 0.27% of the population.

There were 303 households, out of which 34.7% had children under the age of 18 living with them, 57.1% were married couples living together, 9.6% had a female householder with no husband present, and 29.4% were non-families. 21.1% of all households were made up of individuals, and 7.3% had someone living alone who was 65 years of age or older.  The average household size was 2.45 and the average family size was 2.83.

In the town, the population was spread out, with 24.5% under the age of 18, 6.2% from 18 to 24, 35.8% from 25 to 44, 24.4% from 45 to 64, and 9.2% who were 65 years of age or older.  The median age was 38 years. For every 100 females, there were 100.8 males.  For every 100 females age 18 and over, there were 98.2 males.

The median income for a household in the town was $36,333, and the median income for a family was $39,000. Males had a median income of $31,065 versus $22,019 for females. The per capita income for the town was $16,380.  About 7.0% of families and 8.9% of the population were below the poverty line, including 13.5% of those under age 18 and 3.0% of those age 65 or over.

Notable people
Donald J. Brooks - COVID-19 Vaccination Data Lead at the World Health Organization

References

Towns in Penobscot County, Maine
Towns in Maine